The Annual Review of Analytical Chemistry is a peer-reviewed academic journal that publishes an annual volume of review articles relevant to analytical chemistry. It was established in 2008 and is published by Annual Reviews.

History
The Annual Review of Analytical Chemistry was first published in 2008 by nonprofit publisher Annual Reviews. Its founding editors were Edward S. Yeung and Richard N. Zare. Though it began with a physical edition, it is now only published electronically.

Scope and indexing
The Annual Review of Analytical Chemistry defines its scope as covering significant developments in analytical chemistry, drawing from the related disciplines of biology, engineering, and physics. As of 2022, Journal Citation Reports lists the journal's impact factor as 12.4, ranking it fourth of 87 journals in the category "Chemistry, Analytical" and first of 43 in "Spectroscopy".  It is abstracted and indexed in Scopus, Science Citation Index Expanded, EMBASE, MEDLINE, and Academic Search, among others.

Editorial processes
The Annual Review of Analytical Chemistry is helmed by the editor or the co-editors. The editor is assisted by the editorial committee, which includes associate editors, regular members, and occasionally guest editors. Guest members participate at the invitation of the editor, and serve terms of one year. All other members of the editorial committee are appointed by the Annual Reviews board of directors and serve five-year terms. The editorial committee determines which topics should be included in each volume and solicits reviews from qualified authors. Unsolicited manuscripts are not accepted. Peer review of accepted manuscripts is undertaken by the editorial committee.

Editors of volumes
Dates indicate publication years in which someone was credited as a lead editor or co-editor of a journal volume. 
The planning process for a volume begins well before the volume appears, so appointment to the position of lead editor generally occurred prior to the first year shown here. An editor who has retired or died may be credited as a lead editor of a volume that they helped to plan, even if it is published after their retirement or death. 

 Edward S. Yeung and Richard N. Zare (2008–2012)
 Yeung and R. Graham Cooks (2013–2014)
 Cooks and Jeanne Pemberton (2015)
 Cooks, Pemberton and Paul Bohn (2016)
 Cooks and Pemberton (2017) 
 Pemberton and Bohn (2018-2021) 
 Bohn and Nancy L. Allbritton (present)

Current editorial board
As of 2022, the editorial committee consists of the two co-editors and the following members:

 Edgar A. Arriaga 
 Abraham Badu-Tawiah
 Antje Baeumner 
 Daniel T. Chiu
 Livia S. Eberlin 
 Robert T. Kennedy 
 Susan M. Lunte
 Patrick R. Unwin

See also
 Annual Review of Biochemistry
 Annual Review of Chemical and Biomolecular Engineering
 Annual Review of Physical Chemistry

References 

 

Analytical Chemistry
Annual journals
Publications established in 2008
English-language journals
Chemistry journals